Sodje is the name of several people:

Akpo Sodje, English footballer
Bright Sodje, Nigerian rugby player
Efe Sodje, footballer
Onome Sodje, Nigerian footballer
Sam Sodje, footballer